Glitterbomb may refer to:

Glitter bombing, an act of protest where glitter is thrown on public figures, especially those perceived to be homophobes
Glitterbomb, a schnapps-based cocktail; see List of cocktails
"Glitterbomb", a 2001 song by The Bled from His First Crush
"Glitterbomb", a 2017 song by Incubus from 8
"Glitterbombed", a 2013 song by Charlotte Church from Two

See also
Glitter